Statistics of Qatar Stars League for the 1993–94 season.

Overview
Al-Arabi Sports Club won the championship.

References
Qatar - List of final tables (RSSSF)

1993–94 in Asian association football leagues
1993–94 in Qatari football